Arrendale may refer to:

 Arrandale microprocessor, an Intel mobile processor, based on Westmere microarchitecture.
 Arrendale State Prison, a women's prison located Alto, Georgia.